Abramtsevo is a rural locality (a village) in Spasskoye Rural Settlement of Vologodsky District, Vologda Oblast, Russia. The population was 7 as of 2002. There are 4 streets.

Geography 
Abramtsevo is located 8 km southwest of Vologda (the district's administrative centre) by road. Yaskino is the nearest rural locality.

References 

Rural localities in Vologodsky District